Doodle 4 Google, also stylized Doodle4Google, is an annual competition in various countries, held by Google, to have children create a Google doodle that will be featured on the local Google homepage as a doodle.

History
Google features logos on their homepage, usually for public holidays. In the past, events such as the beginning of spring, the anniversary of understanding DNA, or the invention of the laser have been celebrated.  The original Google "doodle" was in  1998 when Sergey Brin and Lawrence E. Page were attending the Burning Man Festival, to show that they were out of the office and unable to help if the systems were to crash.

Doodle 4 Google US
Submissions from all students in U.S. schools from kindergarten to twelfth grade. Parents/Educators are required to submit doodles for their students.

Prizes
The winner's doodle will appear on the Google homepage. They will also receive a $30,000 scholarship to the college of their choice, a T-shirt with their doodle on it, a Google Chromebook, Wacom digital design tablet, and a $100,000 technology grant of tablets or Chromebooks toward their school.

In 2019, the winner got $30,000 college scholarship and a $50,000 technology grant for their school.

Previously the winner got $30,000 college scholarship a $50,000 technology grant for their school or a non profit organization, a trip to Google's headquarters in California, Google hardware, and "Fun Googley swag".

Themes
Google chooses themes for the doodles to be based upon:
 "I am strong because..." (2021), Winner: Milo Golding, Kentucky, 10-12 grade level
 "I show kindness by..." (2020), Winner: Sharon Kaur Sara, Texas, 4-5 grade level 
 "When I grow up I hope..." (2019), Winner: Arantza Peña Popo, Georgia, 10-12 grade level 
 "What inspires me..." (2018), Winner: Sarah Gomez-Lane, Virginia, K-3 grade level
 "What I see for the future..." (2016), Winner: Sarah Harrison, Connecticut, 10-12 grade level
 "What makes me...ME." (2015), Winner: Akilah Johnson, Washington, D.C., 10-12 grade level 
 "If I could invent one thing to make the world a better place" (2014), Winner: Audrey Zhang, New York, 4-5 grade level
 "My Best Day Ever..." (2013), Winner: Sabrina Brady, Wisconsin, 10-12 grade level
 "If I could travel in time, I'd visit..." (2012), Winner: Dylan Hoffman, Wisconsin, K-3 grade level
 "What I'd Like To Do Someday..." (2011), Winner: Matteo Lopez, California, K-3 grade level  
 "If I Could Do Anything, I Would..." (2010), Winner: Makenzie Melton, Missouri, K-3 grade level
 "What I Wish For The World" (2009), Winner: Cristin Engelberth, Texas, 4-6 grade level
 "What if..." (2008), Winner: Grace Moon, California, 4-6 grade level

Regions

The competition ran across 10 regions:
 Connecticut, Maine, Massachusetts, New Hampshire, Rhode Island, Vermont
 New Jersey, New York, Pennsylvania
 Delaware, District of Columbia, Maryland, Virginia, West Virginia
 Florida, Georgia, North Carolina, South Carolina
 Illinois, Indiana, Michigan, Minnesota, Ohio, Wisconsin
 Iowa, Kansas, Missouri, central Nebraska, North Dakota, South Dakota
 Alabama, Arkansas, Kentucky, Louisiana, Mississippi, Tennessee
 Arizona, New Mexico, Oklahoma, Texas
 Colorado, Idaho, Montana, Nevada, Utah, Wyoming
 Alaska, California, Hawaii, Oregon, Washington
§

Doodle4Google Canada
Doodle 4 Google is also organized by Google Canada and the winning picture comes up on the Google homepage.

2014
The first edition of Doodle 4 Google Canada was held in 2014. The theme for the year's contest was “If I could invent anything, I would invent …”.
The winner, Cindy Tang, a Grade 11 student from Dr. Norman Bethune Collegiate Institute, Toronto, got to see her Doodle on the Google homepage on February 26.

2017
The theme for 2017 Doodle 4 Google competition is “What I see for Canada's future is...”. Google wants children to represent their views on what Canada will be like 150 years from now.

Doodle4Google India
Doodle 4 Google is also organized by Google India and the winning picture comes up on the Google homepage.

2009 
The first edition of Doodle 4 Google India was held In 2009. The theme for the year's contest was ‘My India’.
The winner, Puru Pratap Singh, a 4th standard student from Amity International School, Gurgaon, got to see his Doodle on the Google homepage on Children's Day last year.

2010 
The theme for 2010 Doodle 4 Google competition is 'My Dream for India'. Google wants children to represent their views on what India will be like 20 years from today through Doodle 4 Google. Some outline points given by Google are given :
 A cleaner, greener India
 Freedom from poverty
 Education for all
 The world's center of technology{bhayander}
 Better roads, futuristic cities.
The contest was won by Akshay Raj, a class IX student of St Aloysius High School, Mangalore.

2011 
The theme for 2011 Doodle 4 Google competition is 'India's gift to the world'. The Children were requested to imagine their own version of the Google logo based on this theme. Varsha Gupta won this year's Doodle 4 Google competition.

The top doodles in India entered an online vote on the Doodle 4 Google website. At this stage, the Indian public helped decide the winning doodles that best captured this year's theme. Any student between class 1 and 10 from any school in India can participate.

The contest was won by Varsha Gupta from Ryan International School, Greater Noida.

2013 
The Theme for 2013 'Sky's the limit for Indian women'
Gayatri Ketharaman, a 15-year-old Pune teenager, emerged as the overall winner for this year's Doodle 4 Google contest.

2014 

The Theme for 2014 Doodle4Google competition was 'A place in India I wish to visit'. Out of 12 finalists, Vaidehi Reddy was declared winner on 12 November and her doodle 'Natural and Cultural Paradise – Assam' was featured on Google's homepage on Indian Children's Day, 14 November.

2015 

The theme for 2015 Doodle4Google competition is '"if I could create something for India it would be...". Nine year-old P. Karthik from Visakhapatnam was declared as winner for his doodle titled "Plastic to Earth Machine." Karthik's Doodle was featured on the Google India homepage on November 14 to celebrate Children's Day.

Latin America 
 Mexico
 Colombia
 Argentina
 Chile
 Brazil
 Peru
 Honduras

Asia
 India
 Philippines
 Japan
Pakistan
Yemen
UAE

References

Visual arts competitions
Annual events
Recurring events established in 2009